The 570th Anti-Submarine Aviation Squadron (Serbo-Croatian: . противподморничка а авијацијска ескадрила) was an aviation squadron of Yugoslav Air Force formed in April, 1961 at Mostar airport.

It was part of 97th Support Aviation Regiment and equipped with domestic-made twin-engine anti-submarine aircraft, Ikarus 214PP. Due to its insufficient performance for the role it was soon withdrawn from Yugoslav Air Force.

Squadron was disbanded in 1964.

Assignments
97th Support Aviation Regiment (1961-1964)

Bases stationed
Mostar (1961-1964)

Equipment
Ikarus 214PP (1961–1964)

References

Yugoslav Air Force squadrons
Military units and formations established in 1961